MV Empire MacColl was an oil tanker converted to a merchant aircraft carrier (MAC) ship.

MV Empire MacColl was built by Laird, Son & Co., Birkenhead under order from the Ministry of War Transport. She entered service as a MAC ship in November 1943, however only her air crew and the necessary maintenance staff were naval personnel.  She was operated by the British Tanker Company.

She returned to merchant service as an oil tanker in 1946 and was eventually scrapped in Faslane in 1962.

References

External links
 FAA history of Empire MacColl 

1943 ships
Empire MacColl
Empire ships
Oil tankers
Ships built on the River Mersey